Hemicyon, also known as the "dog-bear" (literally "half dog", from Greek   (half) +   (dog)), is an extinct genus of hemicyonine bear, which probably originated in Eurasia but was found in Europe, Asia and North America during the Miocene epoch, existing for approximately . Hemicyon is the best-known genus in the Hemicyoninae, a subfamily intermediate between bears and their Caniform ancestors but most often classified as bears. Hemicyonid bears should not be confused with Amphicyonids (bear-dogs), which are their own separate family of carnivores.

Morphology
Hemicyon is widely accepted to have been hypercarnivorous and highly predaceous. Unlike modern bears, Hemicyon walked on its toes; it was not plantigrade, but digitigrade, with long metapodials. This suggests that Hemicyon must have been an active hunter and a good runner, and presumably hunted by pursuing prey on open ground. In life, the genus would have looked something like a combination of a dog and a bear.

Fossil sites
Species of Hemicyon are recognized in the medial Hemingfordian (ca. 18 million years ago) Thomas Farm site local fauna. This record of Hemicyon represents the earliest occurrence of this genus in North America. The Thomas Farm Hemicyon is very closely related to European representatives from the early Burdigalian (ca. 20 million years ago). Other Hemicyon fossil finds include: H. teilhardi from the Middle Miocene Hujialian Formation in the Linxia Basing, Gansu Province, China; an Early Miocene Hemicyon from Lanzhu Basin Shan Mong fauna, China; Hemicyon of the Mid-Miocene Dongxiang and Laogou Formation in Linxia Basin on the northeast margin of the Tibetan Plateau; Mid-Miocene H. sansaniensis of Arroyo del Val area, Villafeliche, Zaragoza Province, Spain; Mid-Miocene H. mayorali of Tarazona de Aragon, Spain; a Hemicyon found at the Somosaguas site, Pozuelo de Alarcón, Madrid; H. sansaniensis from the Mid-Miocene Anchitherium fauna of İnönü locality, NW Ankara; a Lower Miocene (Eggenburgian-Ottnangian: ca. 20 Ma) H stehlini found in the coal bed of Banovići Basin, Bosnia; an Early Hemingfordian hemicyonid (ca. 16 Ma) from the Pollack Farm Fauna, Delaware; and an excellent Hemicyon specimen from the Miocene Santa Fe Formation, New Mexico.

Hemicyonidae fossil evidence may also have been found in the Gaillard Cut Local Fauna, former Canal Zone, Republic of Panama, but it is indeterminant with Amphicyonidae. Despite its close proximity to South America, given the geological context, the Gaillard Cut Local Fauna are distinctly North American fauna and the age of this assemblage is dated between 19.5 and 14 Ma.

References

Hemicyonids
Miocene carnivorans
Miocene mammals of Asia
Miocene mammals of Europe
Miocene mammals of North America
Fossil taxa described in 1851
Prehistoric carnivoran genera